This is a list of notable people who were born in Wellington, New Zealand, or who spent a significant part of their lives living in the region.

The arts

Comedy 
 Raybon Kan – comedian

Drag 
 Pollyfilla (Colin McLean) – drag queen

Drama 
 Russell Crowe – Oscar-winning actor 
 Kerry Fox – actress
 Anna Paquin – Oscar-winning actress
 Antonia Prebble – actress
 Emmett Skilton – actor
 Antony Starr – actor
 Karl Urban – actor

Film 
 Jane Campion – Oscar winning film-maker
 Peter Jackson – Oscar-winning film-maker
 Clive Revill – film and theatre actor
 Richard Taylor – head of film prop and special effects company Weta Workshop; multiple Oscar winner
 Fran Walsh – Oscar-winning screenwriter
 Taika Waititi – film director, screenwriter, actor, and comedian

Music 
 Jemaine Clement – musician, member of Flight of the Conchords
 Brooke Fraser – multi-platinum selling singer
 Anthony Jennings — harpsichordist, organist, choral and orchestral director, and academic 
 Andy Kent – bass player for You Am I
 Ben Lummis – singer, 2004 New Zealand Idol winner
 Tina Matthews – musician (The Crocodiles), puppeteer, writer
 Bret McKenzie – musician, member of Flight of the Conchords
 John Psathas – composer
 John Charles - composer
 Eddie Rayner – musician – Crowded House, Split Enz 
 Frankie Stevens – entertainer, singer and judge of New Zealand Idol
 Jon Toogood – singer and guitarist for the rock band Shihad
 Rosita Vai – singer, 2005 New Zealand Idol winner

Visual arts 
 Tom Scott – cartoonist, political commentator

Writing 
 Ann Shulgin – author
 Ivan Bootham – novelist, short story writer, poet and composer
 Neil Cross – writer 
 Richard Curtis – movie and TV writer and director
 Lauris Edmond – poet
 Robin Hyde – poet
 John Gallas – poet and educator
 Patricia Grace – writer 
 Lloyd Jones – writer
 Elizabeth Knox –  author
 Katherine Mansfield – writer 
 Bruce Mason – playwright
 Christopher Pugsley – writer
 Sydney Goodsir Smith – Scots language poet

Broadcasting
 John Campbell – broadcaster and news journalist
 Selwyn Toogood (dec.) – broadcaster

Business
 Sam Morgan – founder of online auction site TradeMe
 Peter Vincent – entrepreneur, founder/CEO of Vincent Aviation
 Dame Therese Walsh – chief operating officer for the 2011 Rugby World Cup and head of the organising body for the 2015 Cricket World Cup
 Jack Yan – publisher and graphic designer

Politics and public service
 Lettie Annie Allen – public servant and political activist
 Robin Cooke, Baron Cooke of Thorndon (dec.) – barrister and jurist
 Francis Fisher – politician, tennis player
 Jessica Hammond – The Opportunities Party politician
 Bill Hastings – lawyer, Chief Censor
 Joe Mack – trade union leader
 Jack Marshall (dec.) – former Prime Minister
 Gerald O'Brien – public servant and politician
 Nancy Wake (dec.) – World War II British agent
 Fran Wilde – Mayor, Member of Parliament
 Michael Wilford – diplomat

Religion
 Francis Douglas – Catholic missionary priest killed in World War II
 Thomas Stafford Cardinal Williams (born 1930) – Cardinal-Priest of Gesù Divin Maestro alla Pineta Sacchetti (1983–present); Fifth Catholic Archbishop of Wellington and Metropolitan of New Zealand (1979–2005)

Science and technology
 Rod Drury – technology entrepreneur
 Alan MacDiarmid (dec.) – scientist
Richard Cockburn Maclaurin (dec.) – physicist, foundation professor of Victoria University and president of MIT
 William Hayward Pickering (dec.) – electrical engineer, former head of the Jet Propulsion Laboratory in California
Matt Visser – physicist and mathematician

Sport
 Leo Bertos – footballer
 Jim Cassidy – jockey
 Murray Chandler – chess grandmaster
 Russell Coutts – professional sailor
 Anton Down-Jenkins (born 1999)  – diver
 Phillip Drew (born 1986) – international croquet player
 Simon Elliott – footballer
 Chris Killen – footballer
 Melissa Moon – two-time world mountain running champion
 Jeetan Patel – cricketer
 Wynton Rufer – footballer
 Jonathan Sarfati – chess master and author, raised in Wellington
 Ross Taylor (born 1984) – cricketer
 Ruby Tui (born 1991) –  rugby sevens player.
 Tana Umaga – former captain of the All Blacks
 Rob Szabo – darts player

Other
Ben Hana – a well-known homeless man
Harold Jack Underwood (1908–1979) – clerk, farmer, toy-maker and manufacturer
Heinrich Franz Vosseler – engineer and oil refinery owner

References

Wellington